The 8-meter band (40 MHz) is the lowest portion of the very high frequency (VHF) radio spectrum allocated to amateur radio use. The term refers to the average signal wavelength of 8 meters.

The 8-meter band shares many characteristics with the neighboring 6-meter band.  However, as it is somewhat lower in frequency it does display the better propagation mechanisms via the F2 ionospheric layer normally seen at high frequency (HF) which occasionally appear in 6 meters.  However, Sporadic E propagation, whereby radio signals bounce off ionized clouds in the lower E region of the ionosphere, is common on the band in summer.

History 

The 8-meter band was made available 1925-1928 to amateur experimenters in the UK and Irish Free State, also a much wider 8-10 meter band has been allocated to Australia  and Germany. 1927 a series of tests with two portable stations, was carried out during July - September, under the auspices of the Q.R.P. Transmitters Society, operated by 6TA, Mr. G. D. Abbott and 6LL, Mr. J. W. Mathews.

After World War II, for several years (1955-1959), the 8-meter band (38 to 40 MHz) was allocated for ex-USSR amateurs. 1957 - by using a special license Michał Kasia SP5AM conducted experiments in the 38-40 MHz band. Contacts with radio amateurs from far Siberia broke a new distance record on this band.
  
For the International Geophysical Year on October 4, 1957 the Soviet Union launched the first earth's artificial satellite Sputnik 1 and set up to broadcast a beep on 20 and 40 MHz frequencies, its signal was received by scientists and ham radio operators worldwide. A special permission of 38-40 MHz was issued to Club station SP5PRG in Poland. Yellowknife beacon at 38.07 MHz.

In 1988 Department of Communications of Australia granted VK6RO an experimental license for one year to transmit on 2 spot frequencies of 35.81 MHz  and 41.75 MHz to carry out propagation test on paths with a view to ascertain the MUF between 30 and 50 MHz.
In March 1993 The European Radiocommunications Office (now ECC) of the CEPT launched  Phase II of a Detailed Spectrum Investigation (DSI) covering the frequency range 29.7–960 MHz. The results were presented in March 1995. Regarding the Amateur Radio Service the DSI Management Team recommended (among other things) that frequencies in the vicinity of 40.68 MHz be considered for amateur propagation beacons. A secondary allocation to the amateur service is also appropriate.

At the same time NTIA publishes U.S. National Spectrum Requirements: Projections and Trends. Future spectrum requirements for the amateur and the amateur-satellite services were contained in responses to the Notice provided by ARRL and AMSAT including narrow spectrum allocations (e.g.. five, 50 kHz slots) in the range of 30 and 50 MHz. As noted, the request for additional narrow spectrum allocations for propagation experimentation needs to be studied for technical compatibility.

The International Amateur Radio Union (IARU) in Region 1 is currently encouraging member societies to try to obtain propagation beacon permissions at 40 MHz and 60 MHz. However any action on a CEPT or ITU allocation is considered premature and explicitly ruled out at this stage.

Allocations

 June 1998: Slovenia (S5) allocates 40 kHz of spectrum to beacons from 40.66–40.7 MHz.
 February 2005: South Africa (ZS) allocates 10 kHz of spectrum from 40.675 MHz and 40.685 MHz.
 July 2013: Slovenia (S5) allocates 40.66–40.7 MHz to the amateur service.
 April 2018: Ireland (EI) allocated much of the low VHF spectrum to Irish radio amateurs including 40 MHz.

References

External links
40-MHz Blog
Irish 8m and 5m Band Plans

Amateur radio bands